Mather is a census-designated place in Sacramento County, California. The 2010 United States census reported Mather's population was 4,451. It is the site of the former Mather Air Force Base, closed by the federal government in 1993.

Geography
According to the United States Census Bureau, the CDP covers an area of 10.0 square miles (26.0 km), 99.75% of it land and 0.25% of it water.

Climate
The climate of Mather is Mediterranean, characterized by hot, dry summers, at times exceeding , and mild, rainy winters, with lows at night falling below freezing at times.

Demographics
At the 2010 census Mather had a population of 4,451. The racial makeup of Mather was 2,477 (55.7%) White, 393 (8.8%) African American, 42 (0.9%) Native American, 850 (19.1%) Asian, 84 (1.9%) Pacific Islander, 267 (6.0%) from other races, and 338 (7.6%) from two or more races. Hispanic or Latino of any race were 704 people (15.8%).

The census reported that 4,447 people (99.9% of the population) lived in households, 4 (0.1%) lived in non-institutionalized group quarters, and no one was institutionalized.

There were 1,436 households, 679 (47.3%) had children under the age of 18 living in them, 857 (59.7%) were opposite-sex married couples living together, 150 (10.4%) had a female householder with no husband present, 72 (5.0%) had a male householder with no wife present.  There were 115 (8.0%) unmarried opposite-sex partnerships, and 14 (1.0%) same-sex married couples or partnerships. 237 households (16.5%) were one person and 24 (1.7%) had someone living alone who was 65 or older. The average household size was 3.10.  There were 1,079 families (75.1% of households); the average family size was 3.57.

The age distribution was 1,357 people (30.5%) under the age of 18, 379 people (8.5%) aged 18 to 24, 1,571 people (35.3%) aged 25 to 44, 924 people (20.8%) aged 45 to 64, and 220 people (4.9%) who were 65 or older.  The median age was 31.6 years. For every 100 females, there were 100.1 males.  For every 100 females age 18 and over, there were 96.7 males.

There were 1,520 housing units at an average density of 151.6 per square mile, of the occupied units 1,061 (73.9%) were owner-occupied and 375 (26.1%) were rented. The homeowner vacancy rate was 2.7%; the rental vacancy rate was 5.1%.  3,453 people (77.6% of the population) lived in owner-occupied housing units and 994 people (22.3%) lived in rental housing units.

References

Census-designated places in Sacramento County, California
Census-designated places in California